The Pat Sajak Show was an American late-night television talk show that aired on CBS from January 9, 1989, to April 13, 1990.

Cast
The show was hosted by Pat Sajak, best known as host of the game show Wheel of Fortune. To do the talk show, Sajak left the NBC daytime version of Wheel, but remained the host of the syndicated nighttime version he is still hosting as of 2023.

Sajak's announcer and sidekick on the show was Dan Miller, his friend and former colleague from their time working together in the mid-1970s at WSM-TV (now WSMV-TV) in Nashville, Tennessee. The in-studio band was led by jazz musician Tom Scott, who subsequently served the same role on the short-lived Chevy Chase Show.

The house band members were: Tom Scott (saxes), Jerry Peters (piano), Barnaby Finch (keyboard), Art Rodriguez (drums), Tim Landers (bass), Eric Gale (guitar), Carlos Rios (musician) (guitar), Dave Koz (saxes, flute and the EWI—electronic wind instrument)

History

Pre-production
Sajak was hired by Michael Brockman, the CBS vice-president for daytime, children's and late-night programming, who wanted to have a late-night talk show established when Johnny Carson eventually announced his retirement from NBC's The Tonight Show.  Brockman had known Sajak since the two worked for NBC in the late 1970s. At that time, Brockman had approached Sajak, then a weatherman at KNBC-TV in Los Angeles, about hosting a game show, but Sajak rejected the idea, saying what he really wanted to do was host a talk show.  Brockman kept him in mind over the years, and at a lunch meeting in 1986 he reminded Sajak (who by then was hosting Wheel) about the conversation. Sajak confirmed his interest in a talk show, and Brockman went to work getting approvals from his management for the plan and getting network affiliates to commit to the show.

CBS spent more than $4 million for a new sound stage for the show at its Television City studios located above the four studios on the first floor.  A staff of more than 30 was hired, and Sajak signed a guaranteed two-year contract for what was reportedly $60,000 a week.

In an interview held a month before the show premiered, Sajak said he was "not looking to raise the level of TV"; he summarized the elements planned for the show, a plan that "steal[s] liberally" from talk shows past and present.

Premiere
Chevy Chase was the show's first guest; his interview was followed by one with Joan Van Ark, a performance by and brief interview with The Judds, an interview with the outgoing commissioner of baseball, Peter Ueberroth (interrupted briefly when Chase, who followed late-night talk show conventions of the time and remained seated on stage during the show's other guest appearances, raised his hand and asked if he could go to the bathroom). There was an interview with Michael Gross, and then the show ended with a performance by stand-up comic Dennis Wolfberg.

Format
The show's set was similar to that of The Tonight Show Starring Johnny Carson. Its format emulated Carson's model, featuring a monologue, comedy bits, interviews with celebrities, and performances by musicians and comedians. The Pat Sajak Show began as a 90-minute talk show, but was reduced to 60 minutes in October 1989. CBS executives said the show was shortened because the late-night talk show format was better suited for a 60-minute time slot.

Rush Limbaugh
Two weeks before The Pat Sajak Show was canceled, on March 30, 1990, radio host Rush Limbaugh made headlines when he guest hosted the program, and, in a departure from its regular format, entered the audience to get a response about the veto of a bill in Idaho that would have restricted abortion. Directly after announcing that the bill was vetoed, Limbaugh went to the first woman who stood up and was cheering the loudest. The woman denounced Limbaugh's anti-abortion statements earlier in the show, stating "women's lives are more important than any potato" and "You don't know what it's about. You'll never have a baby, you'll never be pregnant. You'll never have an abortion." After a verbal confrontation with the angry woman in the audience, followed by an angry man shouting, "We are gonna be wherever you are and we're gonna denounce and expose you," Limbaugh addressed the camera and stated that he went into the audience in an attempt to show the viewing public that there was an underlying prejudice against him. Due to heckling, Limbaugh decided to conduct his interview with Sydney Biddle Barrows in another studio.

After a commercial break, Limbaugh attempted to address the topic of affirmative action, but was heckled again by several male audience members wearing ACT UP T-shirts, calling him a "murderer" before he could make a point. Limbaugh sat silently with the camera focused on him for nearly a minute while audience members continued shouting phrases such as "You want people to die!" Limbaugh responded with, "I am not responsible for your behavior."

After another break, Limbaugh returned and conducted the final segment after the audience had been cleared. He stated that the audience was not "evicted from the studio" or "forcibly restrained from doing anything they did" and gave CBS credit for handling the situation in the manner it did.

Limbaugh later claimed that the dissident audience members were planted by the show's producers as a publicity stunt.

Cancellation
During its final weeks, Sajak worked four days per week, with a guest host on Fridays. More than a decade later, Sajak (serving as guest host of Larry King Live) interviewed Limbaugh and facetiously said the show "was going so well that they actually auditioned replacements for me on the air." Limbaugh all but confirmed the suspicion.

On April 9, 1990, CBS announced the cancellation due to low ratings, which were generally half the level of Carson's, and were further diminished by The Arsenio Hall Show, which had been launched in syndication the same month as Sajak's show. Some affiliates delayed the show or never carried the program at all, choosing to air sitcom reruns or syndicated shows; there were even some that actually carried Arsenio instead.

The final show aired on April 13, 1990. Because it was a Friday, Sajak did not appear, and comedian Paul Rodríguez hosted in his place.

CBS restored its CBS Late Night block of movies and reruns, which The Pat Sajak Show replaced earlier, and would not program another late-night talk show until the Late Show with David Letterman debuted in August 1993. That show proved far more successful, with Letterman hosting until May 2015 and Stephen Colbert taking over the show in September of the same year.

Legacy
Studio 56 at CBS Television City, where The Pat Sajak Show was taped, would later host numerous other talk shows, including The Dennis Miller Show, Politically Incorrect, The Tyra Banks Show, The Wanda Sykes Show and Rove LA. In September 2012, The Late Late Show with Craig Ferguson moved into Studio 56, returning a CBS late night talk show to that location over 22 years after The Pat Sajak Show was cancelled. As a tribute, Ferguson installed an autographed publicity photo of Sajak from The Pat Sajak Show era on the Late Late Show set's faux-mantelpiece, alongside those of Letterman and previous Late Late Show hosts Tom Snyder and Craig Kilborn. James Corden took over The Late Late Show in 2015, which remains in Studio 56 with a completely redesigned set.

Sajak's first guest Chevy Chase went on to host his own late night talk show on Fox in 1993, which proved even less successful than Sajak's own show.

See also
List of late-night American network TV programs

References

External links
 

1989 American television series debuts
1990 American television series endings
1980s American television talk shows
1990s American television talk shows
1980s American variety television series
1990s American variety television series
1980s American late-night television series
1990s American late-night television series
English-language television shows
CBS late-night programming